Jerry Ellison is a former professional American football player who played running back for five seasons for the Tampa Bay Buccaneers and New England Patriots.

References

1971 births
American football running backs
Tampa Bay Buccaneers players
New England Patriots players
Chattanooga Mocs football players
Living people